This is a list of Indian international footballers, who have played for the India national football team since its foundation in 1938, before the country's independence. Players with 20 or more official caps are listed here.

Bold denotes players still playing professional football.
All statistics are correct up to and including the match played on 10 September 2019.

 Note. There might be more footballers who have played 20 or more official international matches for India.

References 

Lists of India international footballers
Association football player non-biographical articles
footballers
 
Football in India